"Private Line" is the title of a number-one R&B single by singer Gerald Levert. The song, his second solo release, spent one week at number one on the US R&B chart, although it failed to reach the Billboard Hot 100 pop chart. The song was the solo debut single which appeared on Levert's debut album of the same name.

Charts

Weekly charts

Year-end charts

See also
List of number-one R&B singles of 1991 (U.S.)

References

1991 singles